In mathematics, the hafnian of an adjacency matrix of a graph is the number of perfect matchings in the graph.  It was so named by Eduardo R. Caianiello "to mark the fruitful period of stay in Copenhagen (Hafnia in Latin)."

The hafnian of a  symmetric matrix is computed as

 

Equivalently,
 
where  is the set of all 1-factors (perfect matchings) on the complete graph , namely the set of all  ways to partition the set  into  subsets of size .

References 

Algebraic graph theory
Matching (graph theory)
Combinatorics